Area codes 518 and 838 are telephone area codes serving the northeasternmost part of Upstate New York in the United States. 518 was established as one of the original area codes during 1947. Area code 838 was added as an overlay during 2017. The two area codes cover 24 counties and 1,200 ZIP Codes. There are 493 landline exchanges and 100 wireless exchanges served by 47 carriers. The numbering plan area (NPA) it covers in New York State extends from the eastern Mohawk Valley to the Vermont border, and from the Canada–US border to south of Albany. The bulk of this NPA population is in the Capital District (the vicinity of the cities Albany, Schenectady, and Troy). Other cities in the NPA are Glens Falls, Plattsburgh, and Saratoga Springs. The area codes also cover the Upper Hudson Valley counties, Greene and Columbia counties, and some northern parts of Dutchess County.

History
The 518 area is the only one of New York's original five NPAs that still has its original boundaries. Despite the presence of the Capital District, this part of New York is not as densely populated as the rest of the state. As a result, even with the proliferation of cell phones and pagers (particularly in the Capital District and Glens Falls), it was one of the few remaining original area codes (not counting those serving an entire state) that had never been split or overlaid. By the spring of 2016, however, 518 was on the verge of depletion, and it was projected that the region would need another area code by 2019 at the latest. By the autumn, however, it was anticipated that 518 would be depleted during the third quarter of 2017.  An overlay area code, 838, was approved quickly, to be implemented during the autumn of 2017. 

From March 18 to August 19, 2017, telephone calls could be made using seven digits or ten digits (area code + seven digit number). Ten-digit dialing became mandatory on August 20, 2017, with recorded messages reminding callers if they dialed incorrectly. On September 19, 2017, area code 838 was officially added as an overlay to area code 518 making this the second overlay in the upstate region.

Areas served by this area code

By county

 Albany
 Clinton
 Columbia
 Dutchess
 Essex
 Franklin
 Fulton
 Greene
 Hamilton
 Montgomery
 Rensselaer
 Saint Lawrence
 Saratoga
 Schenectady
 Schoharie
 Warren
 Washington

By community

 Albany
 Alcove
 Alplaus
 Altamont
 Altona
 Amsterdam
 Ancram
 Argyle
 Ashland
 Athens
 Athol
 Ausable Forks
 Auriesville
 Austerlitz
 Averill Park
 Bakers Mills
 Ballston
 Ballston Lake
 Ballston Spa
 Berlin
 Berne
 Bethlehem
 Bloomingdale
 Blue Mountain Lake
 Bolton Landing
 Bombay
 Brant Lake
 Broadalbin
 Brunswick
 Brushton
 Burke
 Burnt Hills
 Buskirk
 Cadyville
 Cairo
 Cambridge
 Canaan
 Canajoharie
 Carlisle
 Catskill
 Central Bridge
 Champlain
 Charlton
 Chateaugay
 Chatham
 Chazy
 Cherry Plain
 Chester
 Chestertown
 Churubusco
 Clarksville
 Claverack
 Clermont
 Clifton Park
 Climax
 Cobleskill
 Coeymans
 Cohoes
 Colonie
 Comstock
 Constable
 Copake
 Corinth
 Cornwallville
 Coxsackie
 Craryville
 Cropseyville
 Crown Point
 Dannemora
 Delanson
 Delmar
 Duanesburg
 Durham
 Eagle Bridge
 East Berne
 East Chatham
 East Durham
 East Greenbush
 East Nassau
 East Schodack
 Elizabethtown
 Ellenburg
 Esperance
 Essex
 Feura Bush
 Fort Ann
 Fort Covington
 Fort Edward
 Fort Hunter
 Fort Johnson
 Fort Plain
 Freehold
 Fultonville
 Gabriels
 Gallatin
 Gallupville
 Galway
 Gansevoort
 Germantown
 Ghent
 Glenmont
 Glens Falls
 Glenville
 Gloversville
 Grafton
 Granville
 Greenville
 Greenwich
 Guilderland
 Guilderland Center
 Hadley
 Hagaman
 Hague
 Haines Falls
 Halfmoon
 Hampton
 Hartford
 Hensonville
 Hillsdale
 Hogansburg
 Hoosick
 Hoosick Falls
 Hudson
 Hudson Falls
 Huletts Landing
 Hunter
 Indian Lake
 Jay
 Jewett
 Johnsburg
 Johnsonville
 Johnstown
 Kattskill Bay
 Keene
 Keene Valley
 Kinderhook
 Knox
 Lake Clear
 Lake George
 Lake Luzerne
 Lake Placid
 Lake Pleasant
 Latham
 Leeds
 Lewis
 Lexington
 Livingston
 Long Lake
 Loudonville
 Lyon Mountain
 Malden Bridge
 Malone
 Malta
 Mayfield
 Mechanicville
 Medusa
 Menands
 Melrose
 Middle Grove
 Middleburgh
 Millerton
 Minerva
 Mineville
 Moira
 Mooers
 Mooers Forks
 Moriah
 Morrisonville
 Nassau
 Nelliston
 New Baltimore
 New Lebanon
 New Russia
 Newcomb
 Newtonville
 Niskayuna
 Niverville
 North Creek
 North Greenbush
 North Hudson
 North River
 Northville
 Oak Hill
 Old Chatham
 Palatine Bridge
 Palenville
 Paradox
 Pattersonville
 Paul Smiths
 Perth
 Peru
 Petersburg
 Philmont
 Piercefield
 Pine Plains
 Piseco
 Plattsburgh
 Poestenkill
 Port Henry
 Port Kent
 Porter Corners
 Pottersville
 Prattsville
 Putnam Station
 Quaker Street
 Queensbury
 Ravena
 Ray Brook
 Redford
 Rensselaer
 Rensselaerville
 Rexford
 Richmondville
 Riparius
 Rock City Falls
 Rotterdam
 Rotterdam Junction
 Round Lake
 Rockland
 Rouses Point
 St. Johnsville
 Salem
 Sand Lake
 Saranac
 Saranac Lake
 Saratoga
 Saratoga Springs
 Salem
 Schaghticoke
 Schenectady
 Schodack
 Schoharie
 Schroon Lake
 Schuyler Falls
 Schuylerville
 Scotia
 Selkirk
 Severance
 Sharon Springs
 Shushan
 Silver Bay
 Slingerlands
 South Bethlehem
 South Glens Falls
 Speculator
 Spencertown
 Sprakers
 Stephentown
 Stillwater
 Stony Creek
 Stony Point
 Stuyvesant
 Stuyvesant Falls
 Surprise
 Taghkanic
 Tannersville
 Thurman
 Ticonderoga
 Tribes Hill
 Troy
 Tupper Lake
 Upper Jay
 Vail Mills
 Valatie
 Valley Falls
 Vermontville
 Voorheesville
 Warnerville
 Warrensburg
 Waterford
 Watervliet
 Waverly
 Warrensburg
 Wells
 West Chazy
 West Kill
 West Sand Lake
 Westerlo
 Westport
 Wevertown
 Whitehall
 Willsboro
 Wilmington
 Wilton
 Windham
 Witherbee
 Wynantskill

See also
 List of New York area codes
 List of NANP area codes
 North American Numbering Plan

References

External links

 List of exchanges from AreaCodeDownload.com, 518 Area Code

Albany, New York
518
518
Clinton County, New York
Columbia County, New York
Essex County, New York
Franklin County, New York
Glens Falls, New York
Greene County, New York
Hamilton County, New York
Hudson, New York
Saratoga Springs, New York
Schenectady, New York
Telecommunications-related introductions in 1947
Troy, New York
Warren County, New York
Washington County, New York